Warwickshire Police is the territorial police force responsible for policing Warwickshire in England. It is the second smallest territorial police force in England and Wales after the City of London Police, with only 823 (full-time equivalents) regular officers as of September 2017. The resident population of the force area is 554,002.

History
The force was established in 1840 as Warwickshire Constabulary. It did not, however, even cover all the rural areas of the county until 1857. Birmingham, Coventry, Leamington Spa, Stratford-upon-Avon and Warwick originally had their own police forces.  The Warwickshire force absorbed Warwick Borough Police in 1875 and Stratford-upon-Avon Borough Police in 1889 with Leamington Borough Police lasting until 1946. In 1969, Coventry City Police amalgamated with Warwickshire Constabulary and the force became Warwickshire and Coventry Constabulary. However, with the inclusion of Coventry in the new county of the West Midlands in 1974, Coventry passed to the new West Midlands Police, which also took over the areas of the Birmingham City Police and part of the northwestern area of Warwickshire (around Solihull and Sutton Coldfield). Warwickshire Constabulary reverted to its old name. In 2001, its name was changed to Warwickshire Police. 

Under proposals announced by the then Home Secretary, Charles Clarke, on 6 February 2006, Warwickshire Police would have merged with Staffordshire Police, West Mercia Constabulary and West Midlands Police to form a single strategic force for the West Midlands region. These proposals were subsequently abandoned.

Warwickshire Police was until April 2007 a partner alongside three other forces in the Central Motorway Police Group.

In December 2010, the Warwickshire Justice Centre was completed in Newbold Terrace, Leamington Spa. As well as a police station, the complex houses the magistrates' court, Crown Court, County Court, and other agencies such as the Probation Service and Victim Support. It was officially opened by Queen Elizabeth II on 4 March 2011. A similar complex was already in operation in Nuneaton.

Chief constables
The force has had a number of chief constables since 1857:
 1857–1876 : James Issac
 1876–1892 : J.H. Kinchant (fled to India and dismissed)
 1892–1929 : Captain John Turner Brinkley
 1929–1948 : E.K.H. Kemble
 1948–1958 : Lt-Col. Geoffrey C. White 
 1958–1964 : Peter Ewan Brodie
 1964–1976 : Richard Bonnar Matthews  
 1976–1978 : Albert Laugharne
 1978–1983 : Roger Birch 
 1983–1998 : Peter D. Joslin 
 1998–2000 : Andrew C. Timpson  
 2000–2006 : John Burbeck 
 2006–2011 : Keith Bristow
 2011–2015 : Andy Parker 
 2015–2021 : Martin Jelley
 2021–present: Debbie Tedds

Organisation

The force is run by a chief constable, a Deputy chief constable, an assistant chief constable. , the force has 1,041 police officers, 100 special constables, 87 police community support officers (PCSO), 65 police support volunteers (PSV), and 809 staff.

The county is divided into five districts and boroughs (based on local government districts/boroughs). There are 33 local policing teams within Warwickshire Police – called Safer Neighbourhood Teams,

North Warwickshire Borough
Nuneaton and Bedworth Borough
Rugby Borough
Stratford-on-Avon District
Warwick District

The districts and boroughs are grouped into three policing areas, each commanded by a superintendent. North Warwickshire, Nuneaton and Bedworth make up the North Warwickshire policing area, Rugby makes up the East Warwickshire policing area and Leamington, Warwick and Stratford-on-Avon make up the South Warwickshire policing area.

The current chief constable is Debbie Tedds, who was appointed in July 2021 following the retirement of her predecessor Martin Jelley.
He was appointed to the role on 7 April 2015, following the retirement of Andy Parker. Parker succeeded Keith Bristow on 1 December 2011. Bristow succeeded [ohn Burbeck, who in turn succeeded Andrew Timpson, who in turn succeeded Peter Joslin.

West Mercia alliance
In September 2013, Warwickshire Police embarked on an alliance with West Mercia Police which saw one of the biggest reorganisations the force ever had. The alliance saw the sharing of back office facilities, force systems and support teams. In October 2018, West Mercia's chief constable and West Mercia Police and Crime Commissioner started formal proceedings to end the alliance.  This action was not supported by Warwickshire's chief constable or the Warwickshire Police and Crime Commissioner. The alliance formally ceased to exist in October 2019.

See also
Law enforcement in the United Kingdom
List of law enforcement agencies in the United Kingdom
Table of police forces in the United Kingdom
Warwickshire Fire and Rescue Service

References

External links

 Warwickshire Police at HMICFRS

Police forces of England
Police
1840 establishments in England
Organizations established in 1840
Antecedents of the West Midlands Police